Decriannus was the official architect of the Roman emperor Hadrian, who repaired the Egyptian city of Alexandria.

References

Ancient Roman architects
2nd-century Romans
Year of birth unknown
Year of death unknown
2nd-century architects